Carcinoembryonic antigen peptide-1 is a nine amino acid peptide fragment of carcinoembryonic antigen (CEA), a protein that is overexpressed in several cancer cell types, including gastrointestinal, breast, and non-small-cell lung.

Synonyms:
 CAP-1
 Carcinoembryonic Antigen Peptide-1
 Carcinoembryonic Peptide-1
 CEA Peptide 1
 CEA Peptide 9-mer

External links 
 National Cancer Institute Definition of carcinoembryonic antigen peptide 1

Tumor markers
Peptides